Coari (Choary) is a Brazilian municipality in the Amazon region.

Location

The municipal seat of Coari is one of the largest cities of the Amazonas state. It is the seat of the Roman Catholic Diocese of Coari. The area has reserves of oil and natural gas.
Coari is served by Coari Airport located 6 km from downtown Coari. Porto Urucu Airport located in the district of Porto Urucu 470 km away serves the population residing and working for Petrobras.

Conservation
The municipality is in the Juruá-Purus moist forests ecoregion.
It contains part of the Amanã Sustainable Development Reserve.
It contains a small portion of the  Piagaçu-Purus Sustainable Development Reserve, established in 2003.
The municipality contains 66.15% of the  Catuá-Ipixuna Extractive Reserve, established in 2003 as the first extractive reserve in the state of Amazonas.

Climate

References 

IBGE

External links
 Coari website

Populated places on the Amazon
Municipalities in Amazonas (Brazilian state)